Conasprella lemuriana is a species of sea snail, a marine gastropod mollusc in the family Conidae, the cone snails, cone shells or cones.

Distribution
This marine species occurs in the Indian Ocean off Madagascar

References

 Monnier E., Tenorio M.J., Bouchet P. & Puillandre N. (2018). The cones (Gastropoda) from Madagascar “Deep South”: composition, endemism and new taxa. Xenophora Taxonomy. 19: 25-75.

lemuriana
Gastropods described in 2018